Matti Väisänen (born 23 September 1948) is a Finnish ski-orienteering competitor. He won a relay silver medal and an individual bronze medal at the 1980 World Ski Orienteering Championships.

See also
 Finnish orienteers
 List of orienteers
 List of orienteering events

References

1948 births
Living people
Finnish orienteers
Male orienteers
Ski-orienteers